The following are the appointments to various Canadian Honours of 2023. Usually, they are announced as part of the New Year and Canada Day celebrations and are published within the Canada Gazette during year. This follows the custom set out within the United Kingdom which publishes its appoints of various British Honours for New Year's and for monarch's official birthday. However, instead of the midyear appointments announced on Victoria Day, the official birthday of the Canadian Monarch, this custom has been transferred with the celebration of Canadian Confederation and the creation of the Order of Canada.

However, as the Canada Gazette publishes appointment to various orders, decorations and medal, either Canadian or from Commonwealth and foreign states, this article will reference all Canadians so honoured during the 2023 calendar year.

Provincial Honours are not listed within the Canada Gazette, however they are listed within the various publications of each provincial government. Provincial honours are listed within the page. 

The first appointments to the Order of Canada were announced on December 29, 2022.

The Order of Canada

Companions of the Order of Canada

 John Louis Bragg, C.C., O.N.S.
 Eugene Levy, C.C. (This is a promotion within the Order.)

Officer of the Order of Canada

 Gordon John Glenn Asmundson, O.C., S.O.M.
 Lise Françoise Aubut, O.C.
 James Ashley Corcoran, O.C.
 Michel Côté, O.C., M.S.C.
 Sidney Patrick Crosby, O.C., O.N.S.
 Eleanor Joanne Daley, O.C.
 Ronald James Deibert, O.C., O.Ont. 
 Allen Charles Edward Eaves, O.C., O.B.C.
 Robert Alan Ezrin, O.C.
 Victor Jay Garber, O.C.
 André Gaudreault, O.C.
 Paula Beth Gordon, O.C., O.B.C.
 Laurence A. Gray, O.C.
 Eva Grunfeld, O.C.
 Budd Lionel Hall, O.C.
 Michael Douglas Hill, O.C.
 Walter William Jule Jr., O.C.
 The Honourable Harry S. LaForme, O.C.
 Bernard Joseph Lapointe, O.C.
 Pierre Lassonde, O.C., G.O.Q. (This is a promotion within the Order.)
 Andreas Laupacis, O.C.
 Yves Lenoir, O.C.
 David Frederick Ley, O.C.
 Richard Caruthers Little, O.C.
 Gerald James Lozinski, O.C. 
 Joan Mary Lozinski, O.C.
 Ivar Mendez, O.C.
 The Honourable Gerald M. Morin, O.C., K.C.
 Eli Rubenstein, O.C.
 David Saint-Jacques, O.C., O.Q.
 Brian Edward Stewart, O.C., O.Ont.
 Barbara Lewis Zimmerman, O.C.

Members of the Order of Canada

 Jean Aitcheson, C.M.
 Shelley Diane Ambrose, C.M.
 Ted Barris, C.M.
 Marie-Dominique Beaulieu, C.M., C.Q.
 Stephen Alfred Bell, C.M., O.M.
 John J. M. Bergeron, C.M., C.Q.
 Kevin Luke Blackmore, C.M.
 Sheila Ruth Block, C.M.
 Bernard Joseph Bocquel, C.M.
 Louis André Borfiga, C.M.
 Yvonne Bonnie Bressette, C.M.
 André H. Caron, C.M.
 Timothy Allen Caulfield, C.M.
 The Honourable Maria Emma Chaput, C.M.
 Wayne Chaulk, C.M.
 Angela Ella Cooper Brathwaite, C.M., O.Ont.
 Alan Côté, C.M.
 Armand Calixte Doucet, C.M., M.S.M.
 Douglas Allen Dunsmore, C.M.
 Konrad Eisenbichler, C.M.
 Carolyn R. Freeman, C.M.
 Patricia Garel, C.M.
 Félix Gauthier, C.M.
 Samuel Gewurz, C.M.
 Hamlin Washington Grange, C.M.
 Allan Edward Gross, C.M., O.Ont.
 Feridun Hamdullahpur, C.M.
 Lori Haskell, C.M.
 Raymond John Johnson, C.M.
 Colleen Patricia Jones, C.M.
 Martin F. Katz, C.M.
 Simon Sean Keith, C.M.
 Warren Charles Seymour Kimel, C.M.
 Donald Arnold Kossick, C.M.
 Stéphane Laporte, C.M.
 Karina Chenelle LeBlanc, C.M.
 Philippe Lette, C.M.
 Frederick John Longstaffe, C.M.
 John Robert Lounds, C.M.
 Brian Gerald MacKay-Lyons, C.M.
 Conor Gerard Maguire, C.M.
 Michael Massey, C.M., A.O.E.
 Jacqueline Mary Elizabeth Maxwell, C.M., O.Ont.
 Marc Daniel Mayer, C.M.
 Heather Mary McGregor, C.M.
 Roderick McKendrick, C.M.
 Bill Howard Namagoose, C.M.
 Patricia Margaret Ningewance, C.M.
 Michèle Ouimet, C.M., C.Q.
 Pitman Benjamin Potter, C.M.
 Benoît Robert, C.M.
 Frantz Saintellemy, C.M.
 Raymond Saint-Pierre, C.M.
 Victor Sarin, C.M.
 Michael Schmidt, C.M.
 Gary S. Segal, C.M.
 Lorraine P. Segato, C.M.
 William George Sembo, C.M.
 Mark Geoffrey Sirett, C.M.
 Donat Taddeo, C.M.
 Laurier Thibault, C.M.
 Mac Van Wielingen, C.M.
 Stanley Vollant, C.M., C.Q., M.S.C.
 The Honourable Konrad Winrich Graf Finck von Finckenstein, C.M., K.C.
 Richard D. Weisel, C.M.

Royal Victorian Order

Member of the Royal Victorian Order
 Cathy Lynne Bursey-Sabourin, MVO, Fraser Herald and Principal Artist, Canadian Heraldic Authority

References 

Orders, decorations, and medals of Canada
New Year Honours
Canadian